Minerva Mills Ltd. and Ors. v. Union Of India and Ors. (case number: Writ Petition (Civil) 356 of 1977; case citation: AIR 1980 SC 1789) is a landmark decision of the Supreme Court of India that applied and evolved the basic structure doctrine of the Constitution of India.

In the Minerva Mills case, the Supreme Court provided key clarifications on the interpretation of the basic structure doctrine. The court  ruled that the power of the parliament to amend the constitution is limited by the constitution. Hence the parliament cannot exercise this limited power to grant itself an unlimited power. In addition, a majority of the court also held that the parliament's power to amend is not a power to destroy. Hence the parliament cannot emasculate the fundamental rights of individuals, and also includes the right to liberty and equality (which is not a fundamental right but considered a basic structure of the Constitution) .

The ruling struck down clause 4 and 5 of the Constitution (Forty-second Amendment) Act, 1976 enacted during the Emergency imposed by Prime Minister Indira Gandhi.

Judgement

(5)  For the removal of easy doubts, it is hereby declared that there shall
be no limitation whatever on the constituent power of Parliament to
amend by way of addition, variation or repeal the provisions of this
Constitution under this article.

The above clauses were unanimously ruled as unconstitutional. Chief Justice Y. V. Chandrachud explained in his opinion that since, as had been previously held in Kesavananda Bharati v. State of Kerala, the power of Parliament to amend the constitution was limited, it could not by amending the constitution convert this limited power into an unlimited power (as it had purported to do by the 42nd amendment).

Section 4 of the 42nd Amendment, had amended Article 31C of the Constitution to accord precedence to the Directive Principles of State Policy articulated in Part IV of the Constitution over the Fundamental Rights of individuals articulated in Part III of Indian Constitution. By a verdict of 4-1, with Justice P. N. Bhagwati dissenting, the court held section 4 of the 42nd Amendment to be unconstitutional. Chief Justice Chandrachud wrote:

References

Indian constitutional case law
1980 in case law
Supreme Court of India cases
1980 in India
The Emergency (India)